Catherine "Kit" Hoover (born July 29, 1970) is an American television host, sportscaster and broadcast journalist currently serving as the anchor of Access Hollywood, and co-host of Access Daily with Mario & Kit. 

She has worked as a sportscaster for ESPN and Fox News. She has also been a correspondent for TV Guide, a host on The View and a sideline reporter on Shaq Vs.

Early life 
Hoover attended Marist School in Brookhaven, Georgia, where she won three years consecutively both the mile and two mile runs. She was named the "2022 Distinguished Alumni Award Recipient" of Marist School. Hoover earned a Bachelor of Arts in journalism from the University of North Carolina at Chapel Hill.

Career
Hoover made her television debut as a cast member on the first season of MTV's Road Rules in July 1995, a reality television series that followed five to six strangers traveling from location to location in an RV. Following Road Rules, Hoover was hired as an entertainment correspondent for American Journal, a nationally syndicated magazine show. In 1999, she joined Fox News as a correspondent for Fox Broadcasting Company's news magazine FOX Files and also served as a correspondent for The Pulse and Celebrity Spotlight, and also co-hosted the latter. She also hosted FOX Rules with Kit Hoover.

In August 2003, Hoover joined ESPN as co-host of ESPN2's live morning show, Cold Pizza. She conducted live interviews and presented features and highlights on the daily weekday two-hour program. During her time on Cold Pizza, Hoover covered numerous sports events such as the 2004 Summer Olympics, the 2004 Super Bowl, the 2005 Super Bowl, the 2004 NBA Finals, the 2003 World Series, and the 2004 World Series. In January 2004, she became a feature and field reporter for the tennis events such as the Australian Open, Wimbledon and the French Open. She served in this role until July 2006, focusing on topics off the tennis court, interviewing the winner and giving the breaking news while the tennis match. In March 2005, Hoover and her Cold Pizza co-host Thea Andrews, were replaced by Dana Jacobson. She served as a judge on ESPN's reality television show, Dream Job (2004–2006) for the show's all three seasons.

Afterward, she continued her role for ESPN and continued her role on Dream Job and the tennis matches. Hoover left ESPN in September 2006.

Hoover served as a correspondent for the TV Guide Channel from October 2006 to July 2008. On July 27, 2008, Hoover hosted Six Flags TV at the multiple Six Flags Theme Parks around the U.S. She hosted TLC’s lifestyle makeover series Real Simple, Real Life (2008–2009) based on the magazine Real Simple. On August 3, 2010, Hoover made her first appearance on Shaquille O'Neal's sports reality television program Shaq Vs. on the début of its second season. She served as both the co-host of the show alongside Mike Goldberg, as well as the sideline reporter.

Since September 13, 2010, she has co-hosted Access Daily with various co-hosts, and in 2019 became host of the flagship program Access Hollywood.

Personal life 
Hoover enjoys fitness and exercising, especially running. She has been featured on the cover of Woman's World magazine and has shared tips on staying healthy and running in numerous publications such as Self and Women's Health. In April 2020, she was named Women's Health magazines' "Mom Crush" and shared tips on how she stays active.

Filmography

As a television host and personality

As an actress

References

External links
Owens, Deb Karazin (March 28, 2009). "Ten Minutes With Kit Hoover" in Fairfield Magazine.

1970 births
Living people
American television reporters and correspondents
American infotainers
UNC Hussman School of Journalism and Media alumni
People from Atlanta
Tennis commentators
Women sports announcers
American television sports announcers
Road Rules cast members
Marist School (Georgia) alumni
American women television journalists
21st-century American women